Andrew Robson is an Australian jazz saxophonist. 

Robson is the frontman of the Andrew Robson Trio which also includes double bassist Steve Elphick and drummer Hamish Stuart. Robson was nominated for the 2003 ARIA Award for Best Jazz Album with On. Andrew Robson Trio was nominated for the same award in 2001 with Sunman.

Discography

Albums

Awards and nominations

ARIA Music Awards
The ARIA Music Awards is an annual awards ceremony that recognises excellence, innovation, and achievement across all genres of Australian music. They commenced in 1987. 

! 
|-
| 2001
| Sunman
|rowspan="2"| Best Jazz Album
| 
|rowspan="2"| 
|-
| 2003
| On
| 
|-

References

Living people
Australian musicians
Year of birth missing (living people)